Zhongguyue  is a township-level division of Pingshan County, Shijiazhuang, Hebei, China.

See also
List of township-level divisions of Hebei
Guyue Bridge
Xi'an guyue

References

Township-level divisions of Hebei